Hiatus Kaiyote is an Australian jazz/funk band formed in Melbourne in 2011, made up of singer/guitarist Nai Palm, bassist Paul Bender, keyboardist Simon Mavin, and drummer Perrin Moss.

History

2011–2013: Formation and Tawk Tomahawk
In 2010, Nai Palm (born Naomi Saalfield) performed a solo show in Melbourne that was witnessed by Paul Bender. After the show, Bender approached Palm and suggested a collaboration. After working as a duo for a short time, they recruited Perrin Moss and Simon Mavin in 2011 and formed Hiatus Kaiyote. Mavin was then a member of The Bamboos but left that band to focus on Hiatus Kaiyote. 

Hiatus Kaiyote played their first gig at the 2011 Bohemian Masquerade Ball among sword swallowers, fire twirlers, and gypsy death core bands. In February 2012, the band opened for Taylor McFerrin in Melbourne. McFerrin was so impressed with them that he introduced their music to influential broadcaster and record label owner DJ Gilles Peterson.

The band released their debut album Tawk Tomahawk independently in April 2012. It was noticed by numerous musicians including Animal Collective and Dirty Projectors, and the band later received public endorsements from Erykah Badu, Questlove, and Prince, who urged their social media followers to explore the band's music. In early 2013, Gilles Peterson named them the Breakthrough Artists of the Year at his Worldwide Music Awards in London, and shortly thereafter they were introduced to Salaam Remi who had just started working as an A&R executive at Sony Music. Sony gave Remi the opportunity to start his own label, Flying Buddha, and his first signing was Hiatus Kaiyote. The band licensed Tawk Tomahawk to the label, adding an updated version of the song "Nakamarra" featuring Q-Tip. Following this release, the band toured internationally, and in 2014 were nominated for a Grammy Award for Best R&B Performance for "Nakamarra." They were the first Australian act to be nominated for a Grammy in an R&B category.

2014–2016: Choose Your Weapon

In 2014, the band began working on their second album, Choose Your Weapon, which was released on 1 May 2015. The review aggregator Metacritic gave the album a normalized rating of 87 out of 100, based on 6 reviews, indicating "universal acclaim". On 9 May 2015, Choose Your Weapon debuted at number 22 on the Australian albums chart. Nai Palm described the album as an "extension" of their debut, and stated that she and the band had no intention to make a one-genre body of work. Many of the songs on the album started with Saalfield's original ideas and were later fleshed out by the band collectively. During the recording the band wanted to pay tribute to the mixtape format, so they incorporated interludes. 

Choose Your Weapon became the band's first release to chart in the US, reaching #127 on the Billboard 200, and #11 on the Billboard Top R&B/Hip-Hop Albums chart. The song "Breathing Underwater" from the album was nominated for a Best R&B Performance at the 58th Grammy Awards.

Starting in 2016, prominent rap and R&B artists began sampling Hiatus Kaiyote songs, starting with Anderson .Paak's sample of "Molasses" in "Without You" on his album Malibu. The following year, Kendrick Lamar sampled "Atari" in "Duckworth" from his album Damn, and Drake sampled "Building a Ladder" on the song "Free Smoke" from his playlist More Life. In 2018, Beyonce and Jay-Z sampled "The World It Softly Lulls" in "713" from their album Everything Is Love.

2017-2021: Side projects and Mood Valiant 
In 2017, Nai Palm released her debut solo album Needle Paw. In June 2018, Palm was featured on Scorpion by Drake, who has spoken highly of both her and the band. She sang a cover of "More Than a Woman" by Aaliyah, which appears at the end of Drake's song "Is There More?". On 18 October 2018, Palm revealed that she had been diagnosed with breast cancer. While recuperating in the hospital following a mastectomy, Palm and Bender performed a cover of Curtis Mayfield's "The Makings of You" which was released online. Palm announced in 2019 that she was cancer-free.

During Palm's recovery period, the other members of Hiatus Kaiyote formed several side projects. Perrin Moss, under the name Clever Austin, released the solo album Pareidolia in 2019. Simon Mavin formed a band called The Putbacks, and produced the album Control by Natalie Slade in 2020. Paul Bender formed an act called The Sweet Enoughs and released the album Marshmallow in 2020. Bender has also produced albums for Jaala, Vulture St. Tape Gang, and Laneous. Bender, Mavin, and Moss also released an all-instrumental album called Improvised Music 2015-17 in 2020, under the name Swooping (formerly Swooping Duck). 

Hiatus Kaiyote reconvened in 2020 and signed a global publishing deal with Warner Chappell Music. They began work on a new album inspired by Palm's health crisis and her loss of a beloved pet, as well as the social difficulties caused by the COVID-19 pandemic. The song "Get Sun" was arranged and conducted by Brazilian musician Arthur Verocai. The album Mood Valiant was released on 25 June 2021, and reached the Top Ten on the Australian albums chart. The album was nominated for a Grammy in 2022 for Best Progressive R&B Album.

Discography

Albums

Extended plays

Music videos
 "Jekyll" (2012)
 "Lace Skull" (2013)
 "Nakamarra" (2013)
 "Breathing Underwater" (2015)
 "Red Room" (2021)
 "Get Sun" (2021)
 "And We Go Gentle" (2021)

Prominent samples
Anderson Paak: "Without You" from Malibu (2016) samples "Molasses"
Kendrick Lamar: "Duckworth" from Damn (2017) samples "Atari"
Drake: "Free Smoke" from More Life (2017) samples "Building A Ladder"
Beyonce and Jay-Z as The Carters: "713" from Everything is Love (2018) samples "The World It Softly Lulls" live performance in 2013

Awards and nominations

AIR Awards
The Australian Independent Record Awards (commonly known informally as AIR Awards) is an annual awards night to recognise, promote and celebrate the success of Australia's Independent Music sector.

! 
|-
| 2022
| Mood Valiant
| Best Independent Jazz Album or EP
| 
|

APRA Awards
The APRA Awards are held in Australia and New Zealand by the Australasian Performing Right Association to recognise songwriting skills, sales and airplay performance by its members annually.

! 
|-
| 2014 
| Hiatus Kaiyote
| Breakthrough Songwriter of the Year
| 
| 
|-
|rowspan="2"| 2016
| "Borderline With My Atoms"
|rowspan="2"| Song of the Year
| 
|rowspan="2"| 
|-
| "Breathing Underwater"
| 
|-
| 2022
| "Red Room"
| Song of the Year
| 
| 
|-

ARIA Music Awards
The ARIA Music Awards is an annual awards ceremony that recognises excellence, innovation, and achievement across all genres of Australian music.

! 
|-
| 2015
| Choose Your Weapon
| ARIA Award for Best Urban Album
| 
|
|-
| 2021
| Mood Valiant
| ARIA Award for Best Soul/R&B Release
| 
|

Australian Music Prize
The Australian Music Prize (the AMP) is an annual award of $30,000 given to an Australian band or solo artist in recognition of the merit of an album released during the year of award. It commenced in 2005.

|-
! scope="row"| 2021
| Mood Valiant
| Australian Music Prize
|

Grammy Awards
The Grammy Awards is an award presented by The Recording Academy to recognise achievement in the music industry.

|-
| 2014
| "Nakamarra" featuring Q-Tip
| Best R&B Performance
| 
|-
| 2016
| "Breathing Underwater"
| Best R&B Performance
| 
|-
| 2022
| "Mood Valiant"
| Best Progressive R&B Album
| 
|-

J Awards
The J Awards are an annual series of Australian music awards that were established by the Australian Broadcasting Corporation's youth-focused radio station Triple J. They commenced in 2005.

! 
|-
| J Awards of 2015
| Hiatus Kaiyote
| Double J Artist of the Year
| 
| 
|-
| J Awards of 2021
| Hiatus Kaiyote
| Double J Artist of the Year
| 
|

Music Victoria Awards
The Music Victoria Awards, are an annual awards night celebrating Victorian music. They commenced in 2005.

! 
|-
| rowspan="2"| 2013
| Hiatus Kaiyote
| Best Emerging Artist
| 
| rowspan="2"|
|-
| Tawk Tomahawk
| Best Soul, Funk, R'n'B and Gospel Album
| 
|-
|rowspan="5"| 2021
| Mood Valiant
| Best Victorian Album
| 
|rowspan="5"|
|-
| "Red Room"
| Best Victorian Song
| 
|-
|rowspan="2"| Hiatus Kaiyote
| Best Group
| 
|-
| Best Soul, Funk, R’n’B or Gospel Act
| 
|-
| Nai Palm (Hiatus Kaiyote)
| Best Musician
| 
|-

National Live Music Awards
The National Live Music Awards (NLMAs) are a broad recognition of Australia's diverse live industry, celebrating the success of the Australian live scene. The awards commenced in 2016.

|-
| National Live Music Awards of 2016
| Hiatus Kaiyote
| Live R&B or Soul Act of the Year
| 
|-
| National Live Music Awards of 2017
| Hiatus Kaiyote
| Live R&B or Soul Act of the Year
| 
|-

Rolling Stone Australia Awards
The Rolling Stone Australia Awards are awarded annually in January or February by the Australian edition of Rolling Stone magazine for outstanding contributions to popular culture in the previous year.

! 
|-
| 2022
|Hiatus Kaiyote
| Rolling Stone Global Award
| 
|
|-

References

External links
 Hiatus Kaiyote official website

Australian soul musical groups
Musical groups from Melbourne
Musical groups established in 2011
2011 establishments in Australia
Brainfeeder artists